Cirsostrema is a genus of very small deepwater sea snails, marine gastropod mollusks in the family Epitoniidae, commonly known as the wentletraps.

The type species of the family is Scalaria varicosa Lamarck, 1822.

Species

 Cirsotrema amamiense Nakayama, 2000
 Cirsotrema amplsum Nakayama, 2000
 † Cirsotrema angulatum Marwick, 1926 
 Cirsotrema benettorum Garcia, 2000
 Cirsotrema bonum J.C. Melvill, 1906
 Cirsotrema browni Poppe, 2008
 † Cirsotrema caelicola Finlay, 1926 
 Cirsotrema canephorum J.C. Melvill, 1906
 † Cirsotrema chathamense Marwick, 1928
 Cirsotrema cloveri Brown, 2002
 † Cirsotrema coronale (Deshayes, 1861) 
 Cirsotrema cribaria A. Adams, 1861 (species inquerenda)
 Cirsotrema ctenodentatum Zelaya & Güller, 2017
 Cirsotrema dalli Rehder, 1945
 Cirsotrema edgari (DeBoury, 1912)
 † Cirsotrema elegantissimum (Deshayes, 1861) 
 Cirsotrema ernestoilaoi Garcia E., 2001
 Cirsotrema excelsum Garcia, 2003
 Cirsotrema fimbriatulum P. Masahito, T. Kuroda & T. Habe, 1971
 Cirsotrema fimbriolatum (Melvill, 1897)
 † Cirsotrema firmatum Laws, 1939 
 Cirsotrema fregata (Iredale, 1936)
 Cirsotrema fusticulus (Monterosato, 1875) 
 † Cirsotrema gagei P. A. Maxwell, 1978 
 Cirsotrema georgeanum Zelaya & Güller, 2017
 Cirsotrema goodalliana 
 Cirsotrema herosae Garcia, 2003
 Cirsotrema hertzae Garcia, 2010
 Cirsotrema intextum Bozzetti, 2007
 Cirsotrema kamiyanum T. Kuroda, 1946 
 Cirsotrema krousma R.N. Kilburn, 1985
 † Cirsotrema kuriense Marwick, 1942 
 † Cirsotrema lyratum (Zittel, 1865) 
 Cirsotrema magellanicum (Philippi, 1845)
 †Cirsotrema marshalli Laws, 1935 
 Cirsotrema martyr (Iredale, 1936)
 Cirsotrema matugisiense (Ozaki, 1958)
 Cirsotrema mituokai (Ozaki, 1958)
 Cirsotrema montrouzieri S. M. Souverbie, 1872
 † Cirsotrema parvulum Marwick, 1928 
 Cirsotrema pilsbryi McGinty, 1940
 † Cirsotrema pleiophylla (Tate, 1890) 
 Cirsotrema plexis Dall, 1925
 † Cirsotrema propelyratum Marwick, 1928
 Cirsotrema pumiceum (Brocchi, 1814)
 Cirsotrema rariforme Lamarck, 1822 
 Cirsotrema richeri Garcia, 2003
 Cirsotrema rugosum (T. Kuroda & K. Ito, 1961)
 Cirsotrema skoglundae Garcia, 2010
 Cirsotrema strebeli Zelaya & Güller, 2017
 Cirsotrema texta E. A. Smith, 1903 
 Cirsotrema togatum (L. G. Hertlein & A. M. Strong, 1951)
 Cirsotrema trabeculatum (A. Adams, 1861)
 Cirsotrema translucida (Gatliff, 1906)
 Cirsotrema turbonilla A. Adams, 1861
 Cirsotrema turriculoides Yokoyama, 1920
 Cirsotrema validum (Verco, 1906)
 Cirsotrema varicosum (Lamarck, 1822)
 Cirsotrema vulpinum (R. B. Hinds, 1844)
 † Cirsotrema youngi Marwick, 1928 
 Cirsotrema zelebori (Dunker, 1866)
 † Cirsotrema zitteli P. A. Maxwell, 1992 
 Cirsotrema zografakisi Poppe, Tagaro & Brown, 2006

 Species brought into synonymy
 Cirsotrema abbreviatum (G. B. Sowerby II, 1874): synonym of Cirsotrema varicosum (Lamarck, 1822)
 Cirsotrema arcella Rehder, 1945: synonym of Cirsotrema dalli Rehder, 1945
 Cirsotrema attenuata Pease, 1860: synonym of Opalia bicarinata (G. B. Sowerby II, 1844)
 Cirsotrema attenuatum Pease, 1860: synonym of Opalia attenuata (Pease, 1860)
 Cirsotrema bavayi DeBoury, 1913 : synonym of Cirsotrema varicosum (Lamarck, 1822)
 Cirsotrema benettorum [sic]: synonym of Cirsotrema bennettorum Garcia, 2000
 Cirsotrema cochlea (Sowerby G.B. II,1844): synonym of Cirsotrema pumiceum (Brocchi, 1814)
 Cirsotrema crassilabrum (G. B. Sowerby, 1844): synonym of Opalia crassilabrum (Sowerby, 1844)
 Cirsotrema douvillei Fenoux, 1937: synonym of Epitonium magellanicum (Philippi, 1845)
 Cirsotrema eximia (A. Adams & Reeve, 1850): synonym of Epitonium eximium (A. Adams & Reeve, 1850)
 Cirsotrema fimbriata Kuroda & Habe, 1954: synonym of Cirsotrema fimbriatulum (Masahito, Kuroda & Habe, 1971)
 Cirsotrema forresti Dell, 1956 : synonym of Cirsotrema zelebori (Dunker, 1866)
 Cirsotrema fragilis (Hanley, 1840), sensu Azuma, 1960: synonym of Epitonium tosaense (Azuma, 1962)
 Cirsotrema funiculata Carpenter, 1857: synonym of Opalia funiculata (Carpenter, 1857)
 Cirsotrema greenlandicum (Perry, 1811): synonym of Boreoscala greenlandica (Perry, 1811)
 Cirsotrema hidryma J. C. Melvill, 1899 : synonym of Opalia hidryma (Melvill, 1899)
 Cirsotrema invalida Verco, 1906 : synonym of Plastiscala invalida (Verco, 1906)
 Cirsotrema jolyi (Monterosato, 1878): synonym of Epitonium jolyi (Monterosato, 1878)
 Cirsotrema joubini (de Boury, 1913): synonym of Cirsotrema varicosum (Lamarck, 1822)
 Cirsotrema kagayai T. Habe & Ito, 1965: synonym of Cirsotrema mituokai (Ozaki, 1958)
 Cirsotrema kelea Iredale, 1930: synonym of Variciscala raricostata (Lamarck, 1822)
 Cirsotrema kieneri C. E. Tapparone-Canefri, 1876: synonym of Amaea arabica (Nyst, 1871)
 Cirsotrema kuroharai Kuroda in Azuma, 1960: synonym of Claviscala kuroharai Kuroda in Azuma, 1960
 Cirsotrema magellanica (Philippi, 1845): synonym of Epitonium magellanicum (Philippi, 1845)
 Cirsotrema mammosa (Melvill & Standen, 1903): synonym of Opalia mammosa (Melvill & Standen, 1903)
 Cirsotrema montereyensis (Dall, 1907): synonym of Opalia montereyensis (Dall, 1907)
 Cirsotrema morchi G. F. Angas, 1871 : synonym of Plastiscala morchi (Angas, 1871)
 Cirsotrema morchi profundior Iredale, 1936: synonym of Plastiscala morchi profundior Iredale, 1936
 Cirsotrema multiperforatum Sowerby, 1874 : synonym of Cirsotrema varicosum (Lamarck, 1822)
 Cirsotrema obtusicostata (G.O. Sars, 1878): synonym of Acirsa coarctata (Jeffreys, 1884)
 Cirsotrema pallaryi de Boury, 1912: synonym of Cirsotrema cochlea (G. B. Sowerby II, 1844)
 Cirsotrema peltei (Viader, 1938): synonym of Rectacirsa peltei (Viader, 1938)
 Cirsotrema pentidesmium S. S. Berry, 1963: synonym of Cirsotrema vulpinum (Hinds, 1844)
 Cirsotrema perplexa W. H. Pease, 1860 : synonym of Gyroscala lamellosa (Lamarck, 1822)
 Cirsotrema pumicea (Brocchi, 1814): synonym of Cirsotrema cochlea (G. B. Sowerby II, 1844)
 Cirsotrema reevei Clessin, 1897: synonym of Boreoscala zelebori (Dunker, 1866): synonym of Cirsotrema zelebori (Dunker, 1866)
 Cirsotrema soror Odhner, 1919: synonym of Opalia soror (Odhner, 1919)
 Cirsotrema suturalis R. B. Hinds, 1844 : synonym of Plastiscala suturalis (Hinds, 1843)
 Cirsotrema undulata Sowerby, 1844 : synonym of Acirsa borealis (Lyell, 1841)

References

 Marwick, J. (1928). The Tertiary Mollusca of the Chatham Islands, including a generic review of the New Zealand Pectinidae. Transactions of the New Zealand Institute. 58: 431-506
 Kilburn, R.N., 1985. The family Epitoniidae (Mollusca: Gastropoda) in southern Africa and Mozambique. Annals of the Natal Museum 27(1): 239-337
 Beu, A.G. 2011 Marine Molluscs of oxygen isotope stages of the last 2 million years in New Zealand. Part 4. Gastropoda (Ptenoglossa, Neogastropoda, Heterobranchia). Journal of the Royal Society of New Zealand 41, 1–153

External links
 Mörch, O.A.L. (1852). Catalogus conchyliorum quae reliquit D. Alphonso D’Aguirra & Gadea, Comes de Yoldi ... 1, Cephalophora. L. Klein, Hafniae [Copenhagen], 170 pp
 Boury E. (de) (1909). Catalogue des sous-genres de Scalidae. Journal de Conchyliologie, 57: 255-258
 Boury E. de. (1911). Etude sur les sous-genres de Scalidae vivants et fossiles. Monographie des Gyroscala et des Circuloscala. Journal de Conchyliologie. 58(3): 212-260
 Powell A. W. B., New Zealand Mollusca, William Collins Publishers Ltd, Auckland, New Zealand 1979 
 
 Brown L.G. & Neville B.D. (2015). Catalog of the recent taxa of the families Epitoniidae and Nystiellidae (Mollusca: Gastropoda) with a bibliography of the descriptive and systematic literature. Zootaxa. 3907(1): 1-188

Epitoniidae
Gastropod genera
Taxa named by Otto Andreas Lowson Mörch